Aleksandra "Ola" Rudnicka (born 10 October 1994) is a Polish fashion model based in Paris, France. She is known as a muse for Chanel.

Career 

Rudnicka was discovered in Warsaw at the age of 15 at a Zara store, and she started her career after moving to Paris to rejoin her mother and attend university. Rudnicka debuted as a Prada exclusive (both on the runway and in the campaign with an ensemble cast); after doing so, she became one of the "Top 50" models on models.com. In 2014, she appeared in a Vogue editorial which paid homage to a 1948 photo by Cecil Beaton. According to Vogue Poland and Vogue France, she has appeared in every Chanel show since 2014. She is the face of the 2022 pre-collection.  Directed by Sofia and Roman Coppola, she appeared alongside models including Gigi Hadid, Rebecca Leigh Longendyke, Anna Ewers, Vittoria Ceretti, and Mona Tougaard in a short film for Chanel dedicated to the late designer Karl Lagerfeld.

Rudnicka has walked the runway for 3.1 Phillip Lim, Dolce & Gabbana, Victoria Beckham, Chloé, Dior, Valentino, Roberto Cavalli, Marc Jacobs, Calvin Klein, Diane von Fürstenberg and others.

References 

Living people
Polish female models
People from Warsaw
Polish expatriates in France
Next Management models
Prada exclusive models
1994 births